Ginger A. Pooley (née Reyes, born April 22, 1977) is an American rock musician, best known as a bassist and backing vocalist for the Chicago alternative rock band The Smashing Pumpkins. More recently she has played bass for Gwen Stefani and Lea Michele. She is an artist and songwriter who has released solo music under the name Ginger Sling. She was also part of the femme punk band the Halo Friendlies. She has toured all over the world and her music has been placed on many television shows and films. She lives in Los Angeles with her husband and daughter where she continues to create music for various projects.

Early life and education
Reyes was born in Chicago, Illinois, of Peruvian ancestry. She has had a long musical career, playing in bands and writing songs since her freshman year in high school. Her first band was the Israelites, a Christian ska band from La Crescenta, California. She later replaced Cheryl Hecht as the bassist for the all girl pop-punk band the Halo Friendlies. She attended UCLA from 1998 to 2000 and has a degree in history.

Career
Ginger played bass for the band Lo-Ball during the 2001 Warped Tour. The 2004 music video for her song "Faith" was directed by Djay Brawner. In 2004 she released her "Room EP" on Pineapple Heart Records, and in 2005, another EP entitled "Laguna Beach Demos" on the same label.

The Smashing Pumpkins

On April 6, 2007, rock rumor website Buddyhead reported that Ginger Reyes was the new bassist for The Smashing Pumpkins, replacing former bassists D'arcy Wretzky and Melissa Auf der Maur, in the new line-up.

Reyes has taken part in three Smashing Pumpkins music videos: "Tarantula", "That's the Way (My Love Is)" and "G.L.O.W."

In March 2010, Pooley left The Smashing Pumpkins to focus on her family, stating:

Pooley made a guest appearance during the Smashing Pumpkins' Record Store Day performance on April 17, 2010, in Hollywood, CA. She played bass during the rendition of "Bullet with Butterfly Wings". She also played bass for Glee Live in 2010 and 2011 and is working on a solo EP.

Personal life
During The Smashing Pumpkins' concert on February 16, 2008, at the O2 Arena in London, Billy Corgan announced that Reyes had recently become engaged. She married Kristopher Pooley June 22, 2008, in Los Angeles. Pooley is a professional musician who toured as Gwen Stefani's keyboardist and joined the Smashing Pumpkins on their 2008 20th Anniversary tour.

On April 6, 2009, it was announced on The Smashing Pumpkins' official website that Pooley and her husband Kris were expecting their first child later that year. It was announced via Twitter that on October 17, 2009, she gave birth to a baby girl, Talula Victoria Pooley.

References

External links
Ginger Sling MySpace
Bass Player Magazine interview with Ginger Reyes
Ginger Reyes on Fender.com

1977 births
American performers of Christian music
American women guitarists
American rock bass guitarists
American rock guitarists
Women bass guitarists
Living people
American people of Peruvian descent
The Smashing Pumpkins members
University of California, Los Angeles alumni
Hispanic and Latino American musicians
21st-century American women musicians
21st-century American bass guitarists